Romita is a Mexican city (and municipality) located in the Southwest region of the state of Guanajuato. The municipality has an area of 442.10 square kilometres (1.46% of the surface of the state) and is bordered to the north by León, to the east by Silao, to the southwest by Abasolo and Cuerámaro, and to the west by Manuel Doblado and San Francisco del Rincón. The municipality had a population of 105,825 inhabitants according to the 2005 census.

The municipal president of Romita is Oswaldo Ponce Granados.

More information can be found here-
Romita online web site (content in Spanish)

References

Municipalities of Guanajuato
Populated places in Guanajuato